Kallholnoceras is a genus of early oncocerid nautiloids from the Ordovician of Sweden, known only from the Boda Limestone at Kallholn.

References

 Kallholnoceras in Fossilworks 3/6/15

Prehistoric nautiloid genera